Northfield is a city in Atlantic County, in the U.S. state of New Jersey. As of the 2020 United States census, the city's population was 8,434, a decrease of 190 (−2.2%) from the 2010 census count of 8,624, which in turn reflected an increase of 899 (+11.6%) from the 7,725 counted in the 2000 census.

Northfield was incorporated as a city by an act of the New Jersey Legislature on March 21, 1905, from portions of Egg Harbor Township. A portion of Egg Harbor Township was transferred to Northfield in 1931, and then reverted to Egg Harbor Township in 1933.

Geography
According to the United States Census Bureau, the city had a total area of 3.62 square miles (9.37 km2), including 3.58 square miles (9.28 km2) of land and 0.04 square miles (0.09 km2) of water (0.97%).

Unincorporated communities, localities and place names located partially or completely within the city include Bakersville and Dolphin.

The borough borders the Atlantic County municipalities of Egg Harbor Township, Linwood and Pleasantville.

Demographics

2010 census

The Census Bureau's 2006–2010 American Community Survey showed that (in 2010 inflation-adjusted dollars) median household income was $70,980 (with a margin of error of +/− $5,377) and the median family income was $78,727 (+/− $5,763). Males had a median income of $57,027 (+/− $4,611) versus $45,757 (+/− $6,595) for females. The per capita income for the city was $30,675 (+/− $2,461). About 2.5% of families and 3.2% of the population were below the poverty line, including 3.8% of those under age 18 and 5.9% of those age 65 or over.

2000 census
As of the 2000 United States census there were 7,725 people, 2,824 households, and 2,109 families residing in the city. The racial makeup of the city was 91.52% White, 2.65% African American, 0.10% Native American, 2.50% Asian, 0.08% Pacific Islander, 1.81% from other races, and 1.33% from two or more races. Hispanic or Latino of any race were 4.38% of the population.

There were 2,824 households, out of which 35.0% had children under the age of 18 living with them, 59.6% were married couples living together, 11.3% had a female householder with no husband present, and 25.3% were non-families. 21.1% of all households were made up of individuals, and 10.1% had someone living alone who was 65 years of age or older. The average household size was 2.66 and the average family size was 3.11.

In the city the age distribution of the population shows 25.5% under the age of 18, 4.4% from 18 to 24, 29.6% from 25 to 44, 22.7% from 45 to 64, and 17.8% who were 65 years of age or older. The median age was 40 years. For every 100 females, there were 90.9 males. For every 100 females age 18 and over, there were 85.6 males.

The median income for a household in the city was $56,875, and the median income for a family was $62,896. Males had a median income of $43,227 versus $30,227 for females. The per capita income for the city was $25,059. About 4.4% of families and 5.6% of the population were below the poverty line, including 5.5% of those under age 18 and 10.8% of those age 65 or over.

Parks and recreation
Birch Grove Park features over 50 campsites, exercise and nature trails, a bandstand and an extensive children's playground.

Northfield features a large bird sanctuary, dedicated to remaining open space in perpetuity.

Government

Local government
Northfield operates under the City form of New Jersey municipal government, which is used in 15 municipalities (of the 564) statewide. Under this form of government, the council functions as a legislative body: it passes ordinances and approves the appointments of the mayor. The mayor, as executive, is responsible for administrative functions and appointment of all officials. The governing body is comprised of a mayor and a city council who are chosen in partisan elections held as part of the November general election. The mayor serves a four-year term of office. The City Council is comprised of seven members, with one member elected at-large to a four-year term in office and six who are elected from wards to three-year terms on a staggered basis with two seats up for election each year.

, the Mayor of Northfield is Republican Erland V.L. Chau, whose term of office ends December 31, 2023. Members of the City Council are Council President Tom Polistina (R, 2023; 2nd Ward), Carolyn Bucci (R, 2024; 2nd Ward), Gregory Dewees (R, 2025; At Large), Eric Leeds (R, 2022; 2nd Ward - appointed to serve an unexpired term), David Notaro (R, 2023; 1st Ward), Brian L. Smith (R, 2024; 1st Ward) and Paul Utts (D, 2022; 1st Ward).

After Gregory Dewees took office in January 2022 in the At Large seat, the City Council appointed Eric Leeds to fill the Second Ward seat expiring in December 2022 that Dewees had previously held.

In the November 2014 general election, Republican Erland Chau was chosen to fill the balance of the mayoral seat expiring December 31, 2015. Jerry McGee had been appointed by the council in February 2014 to fill the seat on an interim basis after Democrat Vince Mazzeo had resigned to take a seat in the New Jersey General Assembly. The city council chose Jeff Lischin in December 2014 to fill the vacant council seat of Erland Chau expiring in December 2016. Lischin will serve on an interim basis until the November 2015 general election, at which time the voters will select a candidate to serve the balance of the unexpired term. In November 2015, Lischin was elected to serve the balance of the term.

Politics
As of March 2011, there were a total of 5,610 registered voters in Northfield Township, of which 1,331 (23.7% vs. 30.5% countywide) were registered as Democrats, 1,801 (32.1% vs. 25.2%) were registered as Republicans and 2,473 (44.1% vs. 44.3%) were registered as Unaffiliated. There were 5 voters registered as Libertarians or Greens. Among the township's 2010 Census population, 65.1% (vs. 58.8% in Atlantic County) were registered to vote, including 85.9% of those ages 18 and over (vs. 76.6% countywide).

In the 2012 presidential election, Democrat Barack Obama received 2,077 votes (49.3% vs. 57.9% countywide), ahead of Republican Mitt Romney with 2,059 votes (48.9% vs. 41.1%) and other candidates with 40 votes (0.9% vs. 0.9%), among the 4,214 ballots cast by the township's 5,923 registered voters, for a turnout of 71.1% (vs. 65.8% in Atlantic County). In the 2008 presidential election, Republican John McCain received 2,244 votes (49.7% vs. 41.6% countywide), ahead of Democrat Barack Obama with 2,187 votes (48.5% vs. 56.5%) and other candidates with 44 votes (1.0% vs. 1.1%), among the 4,512 ballots cast by the township's 5,879 registered voters, for a turnout of 76.7% (vs. 68.1% in Atlantic County). In the 2004 presidential election, Republican George W. Bush received 2,239 votes (52.6% vs. 46.2% countywide), ahead of Democrat John Kerry with 1,940 votes (45.6% vs. 52.0%) and other candidates with 40 votes (0.9% vs. 0.8%), among the 4,253 ballots cast by the township's 5,296 registered voters, for a turnout of 80.3% (vs. 69.8% in the whole county).

In the 2013 gubernatorial election, Republican Chris Christie received 1,877 votes (63.2% vs. 60.0% countywide), ahead of Democrat Barbara Buono with 950 votes (32.0% vs. 34.9%) and other candidates with 39 votes (1.3% vs. 1.3%), among the 2,971 ballots cast by the township's 5,981 registered voters, yielding a 49.7% turnout (vs. 41.5% in the county). In the 2009 gubernatorial election, Republican Chris Christie received 1,662 votes (50.7% vs. 47.7% countywide), ahead of Democrat Jon Corzine with 1,352 votes (41.2% vs. 44.5%), Independent Chris Daggett with 183 votes (5.6% vs. 4.8%) and other candidates with 36 votes (1.1% vs. 1.2%), among the 3,281 ballots cast by the township's 5,742 registered voters, yielding a 57.1% turnout (vs. 44.9% in the county).

Federal, state and county representation
Northfield is located in the 2nd Congressional District and is part of New Jersey's 2nd state legislative district.

 

Atlantic County is governed by a directly elected county executive and a nine-member Board of County Commissioners, responsible for legislation. The executive serves a four-year term and the commissioners are elected to staggered three-year terms, of which four are elected from the county on an at-large basis and five of the commissioners represent equally populated districts. , Atlantic County's Executive is Republican Dennis Levinson, whose term of office ends December 31, 2023. Members of the Board of County Commissioners are:

Ernest D. Coursey, District 1, including Atlantic City (part), Egg Harbor Township (part), and Pleasantville (D, 2022, Atlantic City), Chair Maureen Kern, District 2, including Atlantic City (part), Egg Harbor Township (part), Linwood, Longport, Margate City, Northfield, Somers Point and Ventnor City (R, 2024, Somers Point), Andrew Parker III, District 3, including Egg Harbor Township (part) and Hamilton Township (part) (R, Egg Harbor Township, 2023), Richard R. Dase, District 4, including Absecon, Brigantine, Galloway Township and Port Republic (R, 2022, Galloway Township), James A. Bertino, District 5, including Buena, Buena Vista Township, Corbin City, Egg Harbor City, Estell Manor, Folsom, Hamilton Township (part), Hammonton, Mullica Township and Weymouth Township (R, 2018, Hammonton), Caren L. Fitzpatrick, At-Large (D, 2023, Linwood), Frank X. Balles, At-Large (R, Pleasantville, 2024) Amy L. Gatto, Freeholder (R, 2022, Hamilton Township) and Vice Chair John W. Risley, At-Large (R, 2023, Egg Harbor Township)

Atlantic County's constitutional officers are: 
County Clerk Joesph J. Giralo (R, 2026, Hammonton), 
Sheriff Eric Scheffler (D, 2024, Northfield) and 
Surrogate James Curcio (R, 2025, Hammonton).

Education
Students in public school for kindergarten through eighth grade are served by the Northfield Community Schools. As of the 2018–19 school year, the district, comprised of two schools, had an enrollment of 919 students and 82.9 classroom teachers (on an FTE basis), for a student–teacher ratio of 11.1:1. Schools in the district (with 2018–19 enrollment data from the National Center for Education Statistics) are 
Northfield Community Elementary School with 505 students in grades K–4 and 
Northfield Community Middle School with 409 students in grades 5–8.

Students in ninth through twelfth grades attend Mainland Regional High School, which serves students from Linwood, Northfield and Somers Point. The high school is located in Linwood. For the 1997–98 school year, Mainland Regional High School was recognized by the United States Department of Education as a National Blue Ribbon School. As of the 2018–19 school year, the high school had an enrollment of 1,226 students and 112.0 classroom teachers (on an FTE basis), for a student–teacher ratio of 10.9:1. Seats on the high school district's nine-member board of education are allocated based on population, with three seats assigned to Northfield.

City public school students are also eligible to attend the Atlantic County Institute of Technology in the Mays Landing section of Hamilton Township or the Charter-Tech High School for the Performing Arts, located in Somers Point. Students may also attend Holy Spirit High School, a Christian high school located in Abescon, New Jersey.

Holy Family Regional School in Ventnor, a K–8 school of the Roman Catholic Diocese of Camden formed in 2008, was co-sponsored by St. Gianna Beretta Church of Northfield. In 2011 the archdiocese closed the school.

Transportation

Roads and highways

U.S. Route 9 is the main highway directly serving Northfield, running south into Linwood and north into Pleasantville. Several major highways are accessible just outside the city, including the Garden State Parkway and the Atlantic City Expressway. These major highways provide connections to New York City, Philadelphia and Cape May.

Public transportation
NJ Transit offers bus transportation in the city between Ocean City and Atlantic City on the 507 and 509 routes.

Notable people

People who were born in, residents of, or otherwise closely associated with Northfield include:

 A. R. Ammons (1926–2001), author and poet, winner of the National Book Award
 Art Blakey (1919–1990), jazz drummer and bandleader
 Vince Mazzeo (born 1964), politician who has served in the New Jersey General Assembly since January 2014, before which he had served as the mayor of Northfield from 2008 through 2014
 Evelyn Nesbit (1884–1967), chorus girl, noted for her entanglement in the murder of her ex-lover, architect Stanford White, by her first husband, Harry K. Thaw
 Walter Fifield Snyder (1912–1993), scholar of ancient history

References

External links

 Northfield City website
 Northfield Community Schools
 
 School Data for the Northfield Community Schools, National Center for Education Statistics
 Mainland Regional High School website
 The Current of Northfield local newspaper

 
1905 establishments in New Jersey
Cities in Atlantic County, New Jersey
City form of New Jersey government
Populated places established in 1905